A trinket may refer to:
 A small showy piece of jewellery, such as a jewel or a ring.
 Trinket Island, an island of the Nicobar Islands
 Trinket (village), a village on the island
 Trinket snake, common name for Elaphe helena, a species of colubrid snake
 The original name of New Zealand rock band The Datsuns
 A troll girl in the comic series Elfquest
 A character in the American animated television series Pepper Ann
 The English localized name of Wei Xiaobao in John Minford's translation of Louis Cha's novel The Deer and the Cauldron
 A small biscuit
 Trinkets (TV series)

See also
 Basque trinquete, a type of pelota court